Kritikos: journal of postmodern cultural sound, text and image is a monthly peer-reviewed open access academic journal published by Intertheory Press. The journal and press were established in 2004 by the current editor-in-chief, Nicholas Ruiz III (University of Central Florida).

The journal is abstracted and indexed in the MLA International Bibliography, EBSCO databases, and Intute Arts and Humanities Index.

References

External links

Open access journals
Publications established in 2004
Literary magazines published in the United States
Monthly journals
English-language journals